Don John Young (July 13, 1910 – May 10, 1996) was a United States district judge of the United States District Court for the Northern District of Ohio.

Education and career

Born in Norwalk, Ohio, Young received an Artium Baccalaureus degree from Case Western Reserve University in 1932 and a Bachelor of Laws from Case Western Reserve University School of Law in 1934. He was in private practice in Norwalk from 1934 to 1952. He was a judge of the Huron County Court of Common Pleas from 1952 to 1953, and of the Probate and Juvenile Court in Huron County from 1953 to 1965.

Federal judicial service

On April 5, 1965, Young was nominated by President Lyndon B. Johnson to a seat on the United States District Court for the Northern District of Ohio vacated by Judge Frank Le Blond Kloeb. Young was confirmed by the United States Senate on May 21, 1965, and received his commission on May 22, 1965. He assumed senior status on July 1, 1980, serving in that capacity until his death on May 10, 1996, in Sandusky, Ohio.

References

External Links
 

1910 births
1996 deaths
People from Norwalk, Ohio
Ohio state court judges
Judges of the United States District Court for the Northern District of Ohio
United States district court judges appointed by Lyndon B. Johnson
20th-century American judges
Case Western Reserve University alumni
Case Western Reserve University School of Law alumni
20th-century American lawyers